Matt Lewis (born December 21, 1998) is an American professional basketball player for the Iowa Wolves of the NBA G League. He played college basketball player for the James Madison Dukes.

College career
Lewis starred at Bishop O'Connell High School in Arlington, Virginia and chose James Madison University (JMU) for college. He entered the starting lineup for the Dukes, averaging 14.5 points and 3.5 rebounds per game in his freshman season, earning Colonial Athletic Association (CAA) All-Rookie Team honors. Lewis followed this up with a sophomore year where he averaged 16.4 points, 4.2 rebounds and 3.2 assists, garnering third-team All-CAA honors. In his junior year, Lewis again improved his scoring average to 19 points per game and earned second-team All-CAA honors, though the Dukes experienced little on-court success, finishing in last place. After head coach Louis Rowe was fired, Lewis chose to declare for the 2020 NBA draft, though he retained his college eligibility by not hiring an agent.

Ultimately Lewis decided to return to JMU for his senior season under new coach Mark Byington, who helped advise Lewis and his family through the testing process. In advance of his senior season, Lewis was chosen as the preseason CAA Player of the Year, although the Dukes were predicted to finish ninth in the 10-team league. While the Dukes' 2020–21 season were paused several times due to COVID-19 protocols, both Lewis and the Dukes team experienced success. Lewis was named the national player of the week by the United States Basketball Writers Association on January 17, 2021 after hitting a school record nine three-pointers in a 30 point effort against Towson. Lewis' 2020–21 season ended prematurely when he suffered a knee injury on February 14, 2021 and was later ruled out for the remainder of the year. On March 5, he was named the 2021 Colonial Athletic Association Player of the Year.

Professional career

Iowa Wolves (2021–present)
After going undrafted in the 2021 NBA draft, Lewis signed with the Minnesota Timberwolves on September 20, 2021. However, he was waived on October 15. On October 26, he signed with the Iowa Wolves as an affiliate player.

References

External links
James Madison Dukes bio
College statistics at Sports-Reference.com

1998 births
Living people
American men's basketball players
Basketball players from Virginia
Iowa Wolves players
James Madison Dukes men's basketball players
People from Woodbridge, Virginia
Shooting guards